The Treason Act 1814 (54 Geo. III c. 146) was an Act of the Parliament of the United Kingdom of Great Britain and Ireland which modified the penalty for high treason for male convicts.

Originally the mandatory sentence for a man convicted of high treason (other than counterfeiting or coin clipping) was hanging, drawing and quartering. The 1814 Act changed this punishment and replaced it with death by hanging, followed by posthumous quartering. The Act was amended by the Forfeiture Act 1870 (in England) and the Criminal Justice (Scotland) Act 1949 (in Scotland) so that the penalty became simply hanging, which was the method of execution for murder.

The original penalty for women was to be drawn to the place of execution and burned at the stake. Burning was abolished by the Treason Act 1790 in Great Britain and by the Treason by Women Act (Ireland) 1796 in Ireland.

The 1814 Act also permitted the King to authorise the use of an alternative method, beheading, which was not abolished until 1973 (although obsolete long before then). The Act was amended by the Crime and Disorder Act 1998 when the death penalty was abolished and replaced with imprisonment at the discretion of the court, up to life imprisonment.

The last execution under the Act was of William Joyce in 1946, for assisting the Third Reich during the Second World War.

Note that hanging, drawing and quartering was never the penalty for counterfeiting or clipping coins (which was high treason until 1832). The penalty for this kind of high treason was the same as for petty treason, which for men was to be drawn to the place of execution and hanged, and for women was burning without being drawn. The death penalty for forging seals and the Royal sign-manual, which was the same as for other forms of high treason, was abolished in 1832, although it was still treason.

See also
Capital punishment in the United Kingdom
High treason in the United Kingdom
Treason Act

Notes

References
(House of Commons), 23 March 1814, vol. 27, col. 342 - 346, at 346 (leave to bring forward bill)
(House of Commons), 25 March 1814, vol. 27, col. 360 (first reading)
Hansard (House of Commons), 25 April 1814, vol. 27, col. 538 - 541

External links
 Text of the Treason Act 1814 as in force today (including any amendments) within the United Kingdom, from legislation.gov.uk.
 Text of the statute as originally enacted

United Kingdom Acts of Parliament 1814
English criminal law
Treason in the United Kingdom